This is a list of kings of Iran of the medieval Islamic period, AD 820 to 1432, arranged genealogically.

For the early Islamic period before 820, see:
 Rashidun Caliphate: Umar (634–644), Usman (644–656), Ali (656–661)
 Umayyad Caliphate, 661–750
 Abbasid Caliphate, 750–1258 (brief/nominal ruling since 820)
 
For the period after 1506, see:
 Timurid dynasty, 1370–1506
 Turkomans: Qara Qoyunlu (1375–1468) and Ak Koyunlu (1378–1508)
 Safavid dynasty, 1502–1736
 Afsharid dynasty, 1736–1796
 Zand dynasty, 1750–1794
 Qajar dynasty, 1794–1925
 Pahlavi dynasty, 1925–1979

See also Monarchism in Iran.

Tahirid dynasty (820–872)

Alavid dynasty (864–928)

Hasanids

The Samanids captured Tabaristan, and the Alavids fled to Gilan in exile, 900–913.

Husaynids

Saffarid dynasty (861–1003)

Samanid dynasty (819–999)

Ziyarid dynasty (928–1043)

Buyid dynasty (934–1062)

Ghaznavids (963–1187)

Nasrid dynasty (Sistan) (1029–1225)

Great Seljuq Empire, 1037–1194

Khwārazm-Shāh dynasty (1077–1231)

Anushtiginids

- Mongol invasion of Khwarezmia, 1218–1221

- Mongol Empire, 1231–1256 
- Ilkhanate, 1256–1335

Chupanids (1335–1357)

Muzaffarids (1335–1393)

Jalayirids (1335–1432)

See also
Shah
 Timurid family tree
 Genealogy of Ilkhans
 Safavid dynasty family tree

Notes and references

Bibliography

The Cambridge History of Iran, vol. 4, The Period From the Arab Invasion to the Saljuqs, Cambridge University Press, 1975.
The Cambridge History of Iran, vol. 5, The Saljuq and Mongol Periods, Cambridge University Press, 1968.
The Cambridge History of Iran, vol. 6, The Timurid and Safavid Periods, Cambridge University Press, 1986.
The Cambridge History of Iran, vol. 7, From Nadir Shah to the Islamic Republic, Cambridge University Press, 1991.

External links

 
Iran history-related lists
Iran
Lists of dynasties